The Canadian National Child Benefit (NCB) initiative aims to help children living in poverty. The program is a partnership between federal, provincial and territorial governments and First Nations in Canada. The federal government provides monthly payments to low-income families with children, and the others design and deliver benefits and services to meet the needs of families with children in each jurisdiction.

See also
 Child poverty in Canada

External links
 Official NCB website

Welfare in Canada
Social security in Canada
Child Tax Benefit
Childhood in Canada
Federal assistance in Canada